The Forest is a French crime drama television series, created by Delinda Jacobs and directed by Julius Berg. It debuted 30 May 2017 on Belgian channel La Une and on 21 November on France 3. The series debuted on Netflix internationally in July 2018.

Synopsis 
Police investigate after a teenaged girl, Jennifer Lenoir, disappears in a forest in the Ardennes, France, and are assisted by her teacher, who had a traumatic experience in the same forest when she was young.

Cast 
 Samuel Labarthe as Gaspard Decker, a new-in-town detective heading the investigation into Jennifer's disappearance
 Suzanne Clément as Virginie Musso, a short-tempered and arrogant cop investigating Jennifer's disappearance; wife of Vincent and adopted mother of Maya
 Alexia Barlier as Ève Mendel, an eccentric teacher concerned by Jennifer's disappearance; adopted daughter of Abraham
 Frédéric Diefenthal as Vincent Musso, Virginie's husband and Maya's adopted father who's having a secret sexual affair with Jennifer
 Patrick Ridremont as Thierry Rouget, an ex-con responsible for the arson of Mendel's home killing  Abraham's wife, Marie, and son, Nathan; father of Ocèane
 Nicolas Marié as Gilles Lopez, the principal at the highschool the girls attend
 Martha Canga Antonio as Maya Musso Virginie and Vincent's adopted daughter who had a feud with Jennifer before she disappeared
 François Neycken as Julien
  as Philippe
 Mélusine Loveniers as Lola Decker, Gaspard's daughter
  as Dr Abraham Mendel, Eve's adopted father
 Inès Bally as Océane Rouget, Thierry's daughter who eventually also goes missing
 Isis Guillaume as Jennifer Lenoir, a sixteen-year-old girl who's disappearance instigates an investigation
 Gaëtan Lejeune as Manoa Willem, a wildman living in the forest; abused as a child
 Anne-Pascale Clairembourg as Audrey Rinkert

Episodes

Production 
The Forest was shot mostly in the Belgian region of Wallonia around Brussels, as well as Dinant, Namur, Rixensart and Court-Saint-Étienne. Filming also took place in France in the Ardennes, particularly around the River Meuse and communes of Haybes and Fumay. The final sequence was shot in Bray-Dunes near Dunkirk.

References

External links 
 
  at France.tv

2017 French television series debuts
Television shows set in France
Serial drama television series
French police procedural television series
La Une original programming
Ardennes in fiction